USS Arcata has been the name of more than one United States Navy ship, and may refer to:

  – a wooden-hulled Coast Guard cutter
  – a subchaser
  – a large district harbor tug

United States Navy ship names